The Community of Nazareth (CN) is an Anglican religious order for women founded in 1936. It was established in Tokyo by the English Community of the Epiphany. It is now under the jurisdiction of the Anglican Church in Japan, the Nippon Sei Ko Kai, and operates a daughter house on the island of Okinawa. 

The community's chapel, residential compound and retreat center located in Mitaka, Tokyo, is a noted design by Japanese architect Shōzō Uchii.

References
Anglican Religious Communities Yearbook:  2004-2005.  Norwich:  Canterbury Press, 2003.

Anglican orders and communities
Anglican Church in Japan
Christian organizations established in 1936
Anglican religious orders established in the 20th century